Line of Fire is an American crime drama television series that was broadcast on ABC for 11 episodes from December 2, 2003 to May 30, 2004 during the winter of 2003-2004. It starred Leslie Bibb and Jeffrey D. Sams.

The show was canceled after just 11 episodes in June 2004, though 13 episodes in all were produced.

Plot 
Two rookie FBI agents (Leslie Bibb and Jeffrey D. Sams) are assigned to the bureau's Richmond, Virginia field office, where their story parallels that of a local mob boss, Jonah Malloy (David Paymer). When a fellow agent is murdered in a shootout with the gangsters, the head of the FBI branch (Leslie Hope) declares an all-out war on the criminal underworld. The following episodes weaved intricately between Bibb and Sams' federal agency and Paymer's gang, though the two storylines rarely met head-on, except when occasionally focusing on an undercover agent (Anson Mount).

Mob boss Jonah Malloy's signature line was "That's that with that."

Cast
Leslie Bibb as Paige Van Doren
David Paymer as Jonah Malloy
Anson Mount as Roy Ravelle
Leslie Hope as Lisa Cohen
Jeffrey D. Sams as Todd Stevens
Julie Ann Emery as Jennifer Sampson
Brian Goodman as Donovan Stubbin
Michael Irby as Amiel Macarthur

Episodes

External links
 
 

American Broadcasting Company original programming
2000s American crime drama television series
2003 American television series debuts
2004 American television series endings
Television series by DreamWorks Television
Television series by ABC Studios
Television shows set in Virginia